Natasha Prior (born 20 January 1998) is an Australian soccer player, who predominantly plays as a defender. She was born in Leicester, England, but was raised in Australia.

She debuted in the 2017–18 W-league season for the Newcastle Jets before transferring to Canberra for the 2018–19 season.

During the 2018–19 season in the fifth round, Prior clashed heavily with Savannah McCaskill and was stretchered from the field. While the initial hopes that the injury was only a mild concussion, it was later revealed to be more severe than that, and Prior was forced to sit out the remainder of the season. As a result of this concussion, which was her fifth in less than six seasons, Prior made the decision to retire at the age of 21, saying "I didn’t really want to have dementia at the age of 30," citing an implied pressure to return earlier than recommended from concussion injuries.

References

Australian women's soccer players
1998 births
Living people
Newcastle Jets FC (A-League Women) players
Canberra United FC players
Sydney FC (A-League Women) players
Women's association football defenders